TRSI may refer to:

 Tristar and Red Sector Incorporated, a demogroup
 The Right Stuf International, an anime- and manga-related retailer